This article details the qualifying phase for rowing at the 2024 Summer Olympics. About two-thirds of the total quota will be awarded to the National Olympic Committees, not to specific athletes, at the 2023 World Rowing Championships, scheduled for 3 to 10 September in Belgrade, Serbia. The remainder of the total quota will be attributed to the eligible rowers at each of the four continental qualification regattas in Asia and Oceania, the Americas, Africa, and Europe, and at the final Olympic qualification regatta in Lucerne, Switzerland.

All qualifying NOCs are limited to one berth per event, and only NOCs with fewer than two berths from the World Championships may compete in the continental qualifying regattas. Host nation France will be automatically granted a berth each in the men's and women's single sculls if it fails to qualify for any rowing event at the various regattas.  Four quota places (two per gender) are entitled to the NOCs competing in the single sculls as bestowed upon the Universality principle.

Timeline

Qualification summary

Men's events

Men's single sculls

Men's double sculls

Men's lightweight double sculls

Men's quadruple sculls

Men's coxless pair

Men's coxless four

Men's eight

Women's events

Women's single sculls

Women's double sculls

Women's lightweight double sculls

Women's quadruple sculls

Women's coxless pair

Women's coxless four

Women's eight

References

Qualification for the 2024 Summer Olympics
Rowing at the 2024 Summer Olympics